Francisco Alarcón is the name of:

 Francisco Alarcón (footballer) (born 1985), Chilean footballer for Unión Española
 Francisco Román Alarcón (born 1992), Spanish footballer for Real Madrid
 Francisco X. Alarcón (1954–2016), American poet and educator